Barbuda North is a village and enumeration district on the island of Barbuda.

Demographics 
Barbuda-North has one enumeration district, ED 90600 Barbuda-North. Before the 2011 census it had enumeration district 90400.

Census Data (2011)

References 

Populated places in Antigua and Barbuda
Major Division of Rest of Barbuda